Cyttaria espinosae (Lloyd), also known by its local name digüeñe, dihueñe, lihueñe, quireñe, pinatra, or quideñe, is an orange-white coloured and edible ascomycete fungus native to south-central Chile and Argentinean Patagonia. The digüeñe is a strict and specific parasite of Nothofagus, mainly Nothofagus obliqua trees and cause canker-like galls on branches from which the fruiting bodies emerge between spring and early summer. The pitted surface generates air turbulence, preventing a build-up of static air around the fruitbodies, thus facilitating wind-borne spore dispersal.

Culinary use
C. espinosae's flavor is described as between sweet and bland. In Patagonian cuisine, the digüeñe is usually consumed fresh in salads or fried with scrambled eggs for empanada stuffing. They are traditionally consumed by the Mapuche people.

References

External links
Chileflora.com

Fungi of Chile
Edible fungi
Parasitic fungi
Leotiomycetes